Peter Spearwater (1790–1855) was a political figure in Nova Scotia. He represented the township of Shelburne in the Nova Scotia House of Assembly from 1836 to 1847.

He was born in Mahone Bay, Nova Scotia, the son of John Peter Spearwater and Magdalena Ritcey. He served in the local militia and arrested François-Lambert Bourneuf, at the time an escaped prisoner; Bourneuf later became a member of the provincial assembly. Spearwater married Eliza Richardson.

References 
 The Diary of Adolphus Gaetz Multicultural Canada

1790 births
1855 deaths
Nova Scotia pre-Confederation MLAs